Arsenyevo is an urban locality (a work settlement) and the administrative center of Arsenyevsky District of Tula Oblast, Russia. Population:

Administrative and municipal status
Within the framework of administrative divisions, Arsenyevo serves as the administrative center of Arsenyevsky District and is incorporated within it as an urban-type settlement. As a municipal division, the work settlement of Arsenyevo is incorporated as Arsenyevo Urban Settlement within Arsenyevsky Municipal District.

References

Notes

Sources

Urban-type settlements in Tula Oblast
